King's Head or Kings Head may refer to:

Pubs
 King's Head, a popular Pub name
The King's Head, Amlwch, Anglesey, Wales
King's Head Inn, Aylesbury, Buckinghamshire, England
King's Head, Bexley, London, England
The King's Head, Bristol, England
The King's Head, Fulham, London, England
King's Head, Merton, London, England
Kings Head Hotel, Monmouth, Wales
King's Head, Roehampton, London, England
King's Head, Tooting, London, England
Kings Head, West Tilbury, Essex, England
Old King's Head, Kirton, Lincolnshire, England
Old King's Head Hotel, Chester, Cheshire, England
Kings Head Tavern, Hurstville, Australia, scene of 2003 Kings Head Tavern shooting

Other uses
Kings Head, Nova Scotia, a headland in Melmerby Beach Provincial Park, Canada
King's Head Club or Green Ribbon Club, a 17th-century English political association
King's Head Mill, Battle, Sussex, England
King's Head Society, an 18th-century organisation funding dissenting academies in England
King's Head Theatre, London, England

See also

Live at the Kings Head Inn, an album by Avail